For timelines of the future of the universe, see:
 Timeline of the Big Bang
 Future of an expanding universe
 Timeline of the far future